German Nikolayevich Osnov (born 7 May 2001) is a Russian footballer. He plays for Rodina Moscow.

References

External links

2001 births
Footballers from Luhansk
Living people
Russian footballers
Association football defenders
FC Lokomotiv Moscow players
FC Akron Tolyatti players
FC Energetik-BGU Minsk players
FC Krasnodar-2 players
FC Chayka Peschanokopskoye players
Russian First League players
Russian Second League players
Belarusian Premier League players
Russian expatriate footballers
Expatriate footballers in Belarus
Russian expatriate sportspeople in Belarus